Tai Tsun Wu (September 1, 1933) is a Chinese-born American physicist and applied physicist well known for his contributions to high-energy nuclear physics and statistical mechanics.

Life 
Born in Shanghai, he studied  electrical engineering at University of Minnesota and became a William Lowell Putnam Mathematical Competition fellow (1953). He obtained an S.M. (1954) and Ph.D. (1956) in applied physics from Harvard University. 
His thesis concerned  I.  The Concept of Impedance  II. High Frequency Scattering and was advised by Ronold W. P. King.
At Harvard, he continued as  Junior Fellow in the Society of Fellows  (1956–59), joined the faculty of applied physics (1959) and is currently the Gordon McKay Professor of Applied Physics & Professor of Physics.
Wu has also had visiting appointments with Rockefeller University (1966), at the DESY in Hamburg, Germany (1971), at CERN in Geneva, Switzerland and Utrecht University (1977).

He has studied statistical mechanics on Bose–Einstein condensation in an external potential, classical electromagnetic theory 
(1960).
With Hung Cheng, he used gauge quantum field theory to predict the unboundedly increasing total scattering cross sections at very high energies, experimentally verified at CERN  and  Tevatron collider.
Wu studied production processes for the Large Hadron Collider, in particular to predict the production cross section of a Higgs particle with low momentum together with two forward jets.
His studies with Chen Ning Yang include CP violation, globalization of the gauge theory, and the Wu–Yang dictionary. More  recently, Wu has studied quantum information processing based on the Schrödinger equation without any spatial dimension in the modeling and application of quantum memories.

Honours and awards
 Fellow of the American Academy of Arts and Sciences, 1977
 Academician of Academia Sinica, Taiwan, 1980
 The Humboldt Prize, 1985
 Dannie Heineman Prize for Mathematical Physics with Barry M. McCoy and Alexander Zamolodchikov, 1999

Books
The Scattering and Diffraction of Waves (Harvard University Press, 1959).  With Ronold W. P. King.
The two-dimensional Ising model (Harvard University Press, 1973).  With Barry M. McCoy
Expanding Protons: Scattering at High Energies (MIT Press, 1987).  With Hung Cheng
The Ubiquitous Photon: Helicity Methods for QED and QCD (Oxford University Press, 1990).  With Raymond Gastmans
Lateral Electromagnetic Waves: Theory and Applications to Communications, Geophysical Exploration, and Remote Sensing (Springer-Verlag, 1992).  With Ronold W. P. King and Margaret Owens

See also
 Wu-Yang monopole

References

1933 births
Living people
American nuclear physicists
People associated with CERN
Chinese nuclear physicists
University of Minnesota College of Science and Engineering alumni
Harvard School of Engineering and Applied Sciences alumni
Harvard University faculty
Chinese emigrants to the United States
Writers from Shanghai
Educators from Shanghai
Chinese science writers
Physicists from Shanghai
Humboldt Research Award recipients
Fellows of the American Academy of Arts and Sciences
Putnam Fellows